(Main list of acronyms)


 m – (s) Metre – Milli
 M – (s) Mega- – One thousand (in Roman numerals)

MA
 mA – (s) Milliampere
 Ma – (s) Megaannum
 MA
 (s) Madagascar (FIPS 10-4 country code)
 (i) Marijuana Anonymous
 (i) Master of Arts
 Massachusetts (postal symbol)
 Megaampere
 Morocco (ISO 3166 digram)
 MAA – (i) Mathematical Association of America
 MAAC – (a) Metro Atlantic Athletic Conference
 MAC
 (s) Macau (ISO 3166 trigram)
 (a) U.S. Military Airlift Command (1966–1992)
 Mid-American Conference
 MACA – (i) Military Aid to the Civil Authorities
 MACE – (a) Multi-Agent Computing Environment
 MACHO – (p) MAssive Compact Halo Object
 MAD
 (a) Magnetic Anomaly Detector
 (s) Moroccan dirham (ISO 4217 currency code)
 (a) Mutual Assured Destruction
 MADD
 (a) Mothers Against Drunk Driving
 MyoAdenylate Deaminase Deficiency
 (p) Multiply–Add
 MAF – (i) Maintenance Action Form
 MAFF - (a) Ministry of Agriculture, Forestry and Fisheries (various countries)
 MAGIC – (a) Major Atmospheric Gamma-ray Imaging Cherenkov (telescope)
 MAGNETAR – (p) Metaprogrammable AGent NETwork ARchitecture
 MAGTF – (i) Marine Air-Ground Task Force
 mah – (s) Marshallese language (ISO 639-2 code)
 Mahasz – (p) Magyar Hanglemezkiadók Szövetsége (Hungarian, "Association of Hungarian Record Companies")
 mal – (s) Malayalam language (ISO 639-2 code)
 MALD – (a) Miniature Air-Launched Decoy
 MANPADS – (p) MAN-Portable Air Defence System
 MANPRINT – (p) MANpower and PeRsonnel INTegration
 MAO
 (i/a) Molėtų astronomijos observatorija (Moletai Astronomical Observatory)
 (p) MonoAmine Oxidase
 MAOI – (p) Monoamine oxidase inhibitor
 MAP – (a) Management Action Plan (Corporate phrase)
 MAPP - (a) Medical Assistance Premium Program
 MAPS – (a) Monitoring Avian Productivity and Survivorship
 MAQS – (a) Museum of the American Quilter's Society ("max")
 mar – (s) Marathi language (ISO 639-2 code)
 MAR – (s) Morocco (ISO 3166 trigram)
 MarBEF – (p) Marine Biodiversity and Ecosystem Functioning
 MARC
 (a) MAchine Readable Cataloging (often also defined as MAchine Readable Code)
 Mailing list ARChive
 Maryland Area Regional Commuter train service
 Massachusetts Animal Rights Coalition
 Mid-America Regional Council
 MARCENT – (p) United States Marine Forces Central Command
 MARFORCC – (p) Marine Force Component Commander
 MARRS – (a) Martyn Young, Alex Ayuli, Rudy Tambala, Russell Smith, and Steve Young (British electronic music act)
 MAS – (i) NATO Military Agency for Standardization
 MASAS – (a) Monte Agliale Supernovae and Asteroid Survey
 Maser – (a) Microwave Amplification by Stimulated Emission of Radiation
 MASH – (a) Mobile Army Surgical Hospital
 MASINT – (p) Measurement And Signature Intelligence
 MATREX – (p) Modeling Architecture for Technology, Research & EXperimentation
 MATS – (a) U.S. Military Air Transport Service (1948–1966)
 MAVS – (a/i) Mobile Artillery Vehicle System
 MAW – (s) Malawi (IOC trigram, but not FIFA or ISO 3166)
 MAX – (i) Meta-reasoning Architecture for "X"

MB
 MB
 (s) Manitoba (postal symbol)
 Martinique (FIPS 10-4 territory code)
 Medal of Bravery (Canada)
 MBA
 (i) Main Battle Area
 Main Belt Asteroid
 Master of Business Administration
 MBI – (i) Moody Bible Institute
 MBBL – (i) (U.S. Armor Center) Mounted Battlespace Battle Laboratory
 MBCC – (i) Migratory Bird Conservation Commission (U.S.)
 MBCS – (i) Multi-Byte Character Set
 MBE
 (p) Member of the Order of the British Empire
 (i) Multistate Bar Examination (U.S.)
 MBIDST – (i) Member of the British Institute of Dental and Surgical Technologists
 MBM – (i) Meat and Bone Meal
 MBR - (i) Master boot record
 MbS – (i) Mohammad bin Salman (current crown prince of Saudi Arabia)
 MBSE – (i) Model-based systems engineering
 mbsf – metres below sea floor, a depth convention used in paleontology and oceanography
 MBT – (i) Main Battle Tank
 MBTA – (i) Massachusetts Bay Transportation Authority – Migratory Bird Treaty Act (U.S.)
 MBTI – (i) Myers-Briggs Type Indicator

MC
 mC – (s) Millicoulomb
 MC
 (s) Macau (FIPS 10-4 territory code)
 (i) Master of Ceremonies
 (s) Megacoulomb
 (i) Military Cross (bravery award)
 (s) Monaco (ISO 3166 digram)
 (i) Mortar Carrier
 (s) Eleven Hundred (in Roman numerals)
 MCA
 (i) Master of Computer Applications
 Micro Channel Architecture
 MultiChannel Analyzer
 Music Corporation of America, the original name of the now-defunct MCA Inc.
 (i) Malaysian Chinese Association
 MCC
 (i) Marylebone Cricket Club
 Mission Control Center
 Motor Control Center
 Movement Control Centre
 MCD
 (i) Minimal Cerebral Dysfunction
 Minor civil division (U.S. Census term)
 MCDL – (i) Model Composition Definition Language
 MCFT – (i) Modified Compression Field Theory
 MCG – (i) Melbourne Cricket Ground
 MC&G – (i) Mapping, Charting, and Geodesy
 MCI – (i) Microwave Communications, Inc.
 MCIS – (i) Mellon Collie and the Infinite Sadness
 MCM – (i) Mine Counter-Measures
 MCMV – (i) Mine Counter-Measure Vessel
 MCNC
 (i) Microelectronics Center of North Carolina
 (i) Mixing Condensation Nucleus Counter
 MCO
 (i) Major Combat Operation
 (s) Monaco (ISO 3166 trigram)
 (i) Movement Control Officer
 MCP
 (i) Maintenance Collection Point
 Male Chauvinist Pig
 MCR – (i) My Chemical Romance
 MCSF – (i) Marine Corps Security Forces
 MCT – (i) Movement Control Team
 MCTIS – (i) Mounted Co-operative Target Identification System
 MCU
 (i) Marine Corps University
 Marvel Cinematic Universe
 Medium close-up (camera direction in British TV scripts)
 (p) Microcontroller unit
 (i) Milk clotting units
 Ming Chuan University
 Minimum coded unit (digital imaging)
 Multipoint control unit
 Municipal Credit Union (New York)

MD
 Md – (s) Mendelevium
 MD
 (s) Fifteen Hundred (in Roman numerals)
 Maryland (postal symbol)
 (i) Medicinae Doctor (Doctor of Medicine/Medical Doctor)
 Mentioned in Dispatches (military)
 (s) Moldova (FIPS 10-4 country code; ISO 3166 digram)
 MDA
 (i) Main Defensive Action/Area
 (s) Moldova (ISO 3166 trigram)
 (i) Muscular Dystrophy Association
 MDF
 (i) Main distribution frame
 Medium-density fiberboard
 MDG
 (s) Madagascar (ISO 3166 trigram)
 (i) UN Millennium Development Goal
 MDL – (s) Moldovan leu (ISO 4217 currency code)
 MDM
 (i) Michigan Dartmouth MIT telescope consortium
 Master data management
 MDMA – (i) MethyleneDioxy-MethylAmphetamine (also known as "Ecstasy")
 MDNA – (p) Madonna's 12th studio album title (2012)
 MDO – (i) Membership Driven Organisation
 MDP – (i) Markov Decision Process
 MDT – (i) Mountain Daylight Time (UTC−6 hours)
 MDS
 MDV – (s) Maldives (ISO 3166 trigram)
 MDW
 (s) Chicago Midway International Airport in Chicago (IATA airport code)
 (i) Military District of Washington
 (s) Minnesota, Dakota and Western Railway (AAR reporting mark)
 (i) Mother’s Day Weekend

ME
 Me – (s) Messerschmitt
 ME
 (s) Maine (postal symbol)
 (i) Mechanical engineer[ing]
 Medical examiner
 Middle East
 (s) Middle East Airlines (IATA code)
 (i) Memory Effect – Myalgic Encephalomyelitis
 MEA
 (i) Maine Educational Assessment
 Middle East Airlines
 Millennium Ecosystem Assessment
 Minimum en route altitude
 Mono-ethanol Amine
 Multilateral Environmental Agreement
 MEAC – (a) Mid-Eastern Athletic Conference (ME-ac)
 MEC
 (s) Maine Central Railroad
 Manta, Ecuador (IATA location identifier)
 (i) Model European Council
 Mountain East Conference
 Mountain Equipment Co-op
 MECC – (a) Minnesota Educational Computing Consortium (later Corporation, dissolved 1999)
 MECCA – (a) Milwaukee Exposition Convention Center and Arena, a former name for the sports venue now known as UW–Milwaukee Panther Arena
 MECO – (a) Main engine cutoff (NASA code for point in Space Shuttle assent when three main engines are shut down prior to External Tank (ET) separation)
 MEDEVAC – (p) Medical evacuation
 MEDLI
 (a) Mars Science Laboratory Entry, Descent, and Landing Instrumentation
 (a) Medical & Scientific Libraries of Long Island
 (a) Model for Effluent Disposal using Land Irrigation
 MEDS – (a) Mission Essential Data Set
 MEF
 (i) U.S. Marine Expeditionary Force
 Minimum essential facility
 Mission essential force
 MEG – (i) MagnetoEncephaloGraphy
 MEI – (i) Matsushita Electric Industrial Co., Ltd.
 MEK
 (i) Magyar Elektronikus Konyvtar
 Message encryption key
 (a) methyl ethyl ketone
 (p) Mujahideen al-Khalq
 MEL
 (i) Maya Embedded Language
 Michigan Electronic Library
 MELT – (a) Metallic Line/Loop Test (ing)
 MEM
 (i) Message Exchange Mechanism
 (p) Microelectromechanical
 MEMS – (p) Microelectromechanical System
 MENA – (i/a) Middle East and North Africa ("MEE-na" or "MEH-na")
 MEO
 (a) Medium earth orbit
 Most efficient organization
 MEP
 (i) Mechanical Electrical Plumbing
 Member of the European Parliament
Missions étrangères de Paris (French for "Paris Foreign Missions")
 Model European Parliament
 MER – (i) Mars Exploration Rover
 MERL – (i) Mitsubishi Electric Research Laboratories
 MES
 (i) Marconi Electronic Systems
 Medium Edison screw
 MESSENGER – (p) MErcury Surface, Space ENvironment, GEochemistry and Ranging
 MET
 (p) Meteorological
 (a) Middle European Time
 METAR – (p) [Meteorological] Aviation Routine weather report
 METL – (i/a) Mission Essential Task List ("mettle")
 METOC – (p) Meteorological and Oceanographic
 METT-T – (a/i) Mission, Enemy, Terrain, Troops, and Time available (mnemonic)
 METT-TC – (a/i) Mission, Enemy, Terrain [and weather], Troops [and support], Time [available] and Civilian considerations (mnemonic)
 MEU
 (i) U.S. Marine Expeditionary Unit
 Maximum Expected Utility
 MeV – (s) Megaelectronvolt
 MEV
 (i) Medical Evacuation Vehicle
 Musica Elettronica Viva
 MEX – (s) Mexico (ISO 3166 trigram)
 MEZ – (i) Missile Engagement Zone
 MES – (a) Manufacturing Execution Systems

MF
 mF – (s) Millifarad
 MF
 (s) Mayotte (FIPS 10-4 territory code)
 Megafarad
 MFSB – (i) Mother, Father, Sister, Brother (1970s Philadelphia studio musicians collective)
 MFT
 (i) Managed file transfer
 Master File Table
 Mean field theory
 Media Foundation Transform
 Micro Four Thirds (camera design standard)

MG
 mg – (s) Malagasy language (ISO 639-1 code) – Milligram
 Mg – (s) Magnesium – Megagram
 MG – (i) Machine Gun – (s) Madagascar (ISO 3166 digram) – (s) Major General – (s) Mongolia (FIPS 10-4 country code) – (i) Morris Garage
 MGA – (s) Malagasy ariary (ISO 4217 currency code)
 MGB – (i) Medium Girder Bridge, Motor Gun Boat
 MGM – (i) Metro Goldwyn Mayer – (s) Montgomery, Alabama (Airport Code)
 MGPAM – My Gym Partner's a Monkey
 MGS – (i) Mobile Gun System

MH
 mh – (s) Marshallese language (ISO 639-1 code)
 mH – (s) Millihenry
 MH – (s) Marshall Islands (postal symbol; ISO 3166 digram) – Megahenry – Montserrat (FIPS 10-4 territory code)
 MHC – (i) Major Histocompatibility Complex
 MHHW – (i) Mean Higher High Water (nautical charts)
 MHL – (s) Marshall Islands (ISO 3166 trigram)
 MHLW – (i) Mean Higher Low Water (nautical charts)
 MHRA – (i) (UK) Medicines and Healthcare products Regulatory Agency
 MHW – (i) Mean High Water (nautical charts)
 MHWN – (i) Mean High Water Neaps (nautical charts)
 MHWS – (i) Mean High Water Springs (nautical charts)
 MHz – (s) Megahertz

MI
 mi – (s) Māori language (ISO 639-1 code)
 Mi – (s) Mebi
 MI
 (s) Malawi (FIPS 10-4 country code)
 Michigan (postal symbol)
 Midway Islands (ISO 3166 digram; obsolete 1986)
 (i) Military Intelligence
 MIA – (i) Missing In Action
 MIAA
 (i) Maryland Interscholastic Athletic Association
 Massachusetts Interscholastic Athletic Association
 Michigan Intercollegiate Athletic Association
 Mid-America Intercollegiate Athletics Association
 MIB
 (i) Men In Black
 Mint In Box (Internet auction/trading listings)
 MIC 
 (i) Military Industrial Complex
 (i) Malaysian Indian Congress
 MICE – (a) Meetings, Incentives, Conferences, Exhibitions tourism
 MICLIC – (p) Mine Clearing Line Charge
 MICOM – (p) Missile Command
 MICV – (i) Mechanised Infantry Combat Vehicle
 MID – (s) Midway Islands (ISO 3166 trigram; obsolete 1986)
 MIDI – (a) Musical Instrument Digital Interface
 MIDAS – (a) Man-machine Integration Design and Analysis System
 MIDS – (i) Multi-Function Information Distribution System
 MIFC – (a) Military Industrial Financial Complex
 MIFG – (s) Shallow Fog (METAR Code)
 MIFPC – (a) Military Industrial Financial Pharmaceutical Complex
 MIKE – (a) Monitoring of Illegal Killing of Elephants
 MIL – (i) Man-In-the-Loop
 MIL-AASPEM – (i) Man-In-the-Loop AASPEM
 MILAN – (p) Missile d´infanterie léger antichar (French, "Anti-Tank Light Infantry Missile")
 MiLB – (p) Minor League Baseball
 MILC – (a) Mirrorless interchangeable-lens camera
 MILES – (a) Multiple Integrated Laser Engagement System (live combat simulation)
 MILF
 (i) Moro Islamic Liberation Front
 (a) Mother I'd Like to F**k
 MILSATCOM – (p) Military Satellite Communications
 MILSET – (a) Mouvement International pour le Loisir Scientifique Et Technique (French, "International Movement for Leisure Activities in Science and Technology")
 MILSTRIP – (p) Military Standard Requisitioning and Issue Procedure DLMSO MILSTRIP Manual
 Mimaropa – (p) Mindoro, Marinduque, Romblon, Palawan (a region in the Philippines)
 MIMOSA – (a) MIcroMeasurements Of Satellite Acceleration
 MIMPT – (i) Member of the Institute of Maxillofacial Prosthetists and Technologists
 MIP
 (a) Multilateral Interoperability Programme
 Multiple Identity Poster
 MIPC – (a) Military Industrial Pharmaceutical Complex
 MIRA – (a) MILAN Infra-Red Acquisition (thermal sight)
 MIRV – (a) Multiple Independent Reentry Vehicle
 MIS
 (a) Management Information Systems
 Museum Information System
 MISREP – (p) Mission Report
 MISSI – (a) Multilevel Information System Security Initiative
 MIT
 (i) Massachusetts Institute of Technology
 methylisothiazoline
 Milli Istihbarad Teskilati (Intelligence service of Turkey)
 MITL – (i) Man-In-The-Loop
 MITS – see entry

MJ
 mJ – (s) Millijoule
 MJ
 (s) Megajoule
 (i) Michael Jordan
 MJD – (i) Modified Julian Day
 MJF – (i) Maxwell Jacob Friedman, American professional wrestler (who currently performs as "MJF")
 MJP – (i) Military Judgement Panel

MK
 mk – (s) Macedonian language (ISO 639-1 code)
 mK – (s) Millikelvin
 MK
 (s) Air Mauritius (IATA code)
 Macedonia (ISO 3166 digram; FIPS 10-4 country code)
 (i) Mandalskameratene (Norwegian football club)
 (s) Megakelvin
 (i) Milton Keynes
 Missionary Kids
 Mortal Kombat (1992 video game)
 Mortal Kombat (2011 video game)
 mkd – (s) Macedonian language (ISO 639-2 code)
 MKD
 (s) Macedonian denar (ISO 4217 currency code)
 North Macedonia (ISO 3166 trigram)
 MKG – (i) Michael Kidd-Gilchrist (American basketball player)
 MKO – (i) Mojahedin-e-Khalq Organization (Persian, "People's Mujahedin of Iran")
 MKS
 (i) Metre–Kilogram–Second (system of units)
 (p) MKS Inc. software company
 MKSA – (i) Metre–Kilogram–Second–Ampere (system of units)
 MKT
 (i) Missouri-Kansas-Texas Railroad (1865–1989)
 Mortal Kombat Trilogy

ML
 ml – (s) Malayalam language (ISO 639-1 code)
 mL – (s) Millilitre
 ML
 (s) Mali (FIPS 10-4 country code; ISO 3166 digram)
 (i) Maximum Likelihood
 (s) Megalitre
 MLA
 (i) Martial Law Administration of Bangladesh
 Master of Landscape Architecture
 Medical Library Association
 Member of Legislative Assembly
 Modern Language Association
 Mutual legal assistance treaty
 Myelosis Leucemica Acuta
 MLB – (i) Major League Baseball
 MLC – (i) Member of the Legislative Council (in India)
 MLE – (i) Maximum likelihood estimation
 mlg – (s) Malagasy language (ISO 639-2 code)
 MLHW – (i) Mean Lower High Water (nautical charts)
 MLI – (s) Mali (ISO 3166 trigram)
 MLK – (i) Martin Luther King Jr.
 MLL – (i) Major League Lacrosse
 MLLW – (i) Mean Lower Low Water (nautical charts)
 MLP – My Little Pony
 MLR
 (i) Medical Loss Ratio
 MLRS – (i) Multiple-Launch Rocket System
 MLS
 (i) Major League Soccer
 Multiple Listing Service
 Multilevel security
 MLSE
 (i) Maple Leaf Sports & Entertainment (owner of several Toronto-based sports teams)
 Maximum likelihood sequence estimation
 MLSR – (i) Missing, Lost or Stolen Report
 mlt – (s) Maltese language (ISO 639-2 code)
 MLT – (s) Malta (ISO 3166 trigram)
 MLVW – (i) Medium Logistics Vehicle, Wheeled
 MLW
 (i) Major League Wrestling (American professional wrestling promotion)
 Mean Low Water (nautical charts)
 MLWN – (i) Mean Low Water Neaps (nautical charts)
 MLWS – (i) Mean Low Water Springs (nautical charts)

MM
 mm – (s) Millimetre
 Mm – (s) Megametre
 MM – (i) Military Medal – (s) Myanmar (ISO 3166 digram) – Two Thousand (in Roman numerals)
 MMA – (i) Mixed martial arts – Moving Mechanical Assembly
 MMC – (p) Machinist's Mate, Chief (USN rating) – (i) Materiel Management Centre
 MMCM – (p) Machinist's Mate, Master Chief (USN rating) – (i) Magnetic Mine Counter Measure
 MMCS – (p) Machinist's Mate, Senior Chief (USN rating)
 MMEV – (i) Multi-Mission Effects Vehicle
 MMI – (i) Man-Machine Interface
 MMI – (i) McLean Meditation Institute
 MMIC – (i) Mindfulness & Meditation Instructor, Certified
 MMIC – (i) McLean Meditation Institute Certified
 MMI – (i) Magical MonkeyZ Inc.
 MMIO – (i) Memory-mapped I/O
 MMK – (s) Burmese kyat (ISO 4217 currency code)
 MMO – (i) Massively Multiplayer Online (computer game)
 MMOR – (i) Master of Management in Operations Research
 MMORPG – (i) Massively multiplayer online role-playing game
 MMPR – Mighty Morphin Power Rangers
 MMR – (i) Measles, Mumps and Rubella vaccine – (s) Myanmar (ISO 3166 trigram)
 MMS – (i) Multimission Modular Spacecraft
 MMU – (i) Manchester Metropolitan University – (i) Manned Manoeuvring Unit
 MMW – (p) Millimetre Wave (radar, from "mm Wave")

MN
 mn – (s) Mongolian language (ISO 639-1 code)
 mN – (s) Millinewton
 Mn – (s) Manganese
 MN – (s) Meganewton – Minnesota (postal symbol) – Monaco (FIPS 10-4 country code) – Mongolia (ISO 3166 digram)
 MNB – (p) Multinational Brigade
 MNB C – (p) Multinational Brigade Centre (KFOR)
 MND – (i) Motor Neurone Disease – (p) Multinational Division
 MNE – (s) Montenegro (ISO 3166 trigram)
 MNG – (i) Multiple-image Network Graphics – (s) Mongolia (ISO 3166 trigram)
 MNMF – (i) Multi-National Maritime Force
 MNP – (s) Northern Mariana Islands (ISO 3166 trigram)
 MNS – (i) Mission Needs Statement
 MNT – (p) Molecular nanotechnology – (s) Mongolian tugrik (ISO 4217 currency code)

MO
 mo – (s) Moldovan language (ISO 639-1 code)
 Mo – (s) Molybdenum
 MO – (s) Macau (ISO 3166 digram) – (i) Medical Officer – (s) Missouri (postal symbol) – (i) modus operandi (Latin, "mode of operation") – (s) Morocco (FIPS 10-4 country code) [mutual oral]
 MOA – Museum of Art (Brigham Young University)
 MOAB – (a) Massive Ordnance Air Blast (official) – Mother Of All Bombs (slang)
 MOB – (i) Man Over Board – Marching Owl Band – Movable Object Block
 MOC – (i) Macedonian Orthodox Church – Measure Of Capability – Mission Operations Centre – My Own Creation (Lego)
 MOCAS – (a) Mechanization Of Contract Administration Services
 MoD – (i) Ministry of Defence (United Kingdom) and various other countries
 MOD – (i) Magneto-optical disc – Masters of Deception – Minimum Object Distance – Multiple Organ Dysfunction
 MoDAF – (p) Ministry of Defence Architecture Framework ("moh-daff")
 modem – (p) Modulator-Demodulator
 ModSAF – (p) Modular Semi-Automated Forces (military simulation)
 Moe – (a) Marvel of entertainment
 MOE – (i) Measure Of Effectiveness
 MOF – (a/i) Ministry of Finance (Japan)
 MOFA – (a/i) Ministry of Foreign Affairs (Japan)
 MOH – (a/i) Medal of Honor – Music On Hold
 MOID – (i) Minimum Orbital Intersection Distance
 MOJWA – (i) Movement for Oneness and Jihad in West Africa
 mol – (s) Moldovan language (ISO 639-2 code) – mole (unit)
 MOLO – (a) Mobile Other Licensed Operator (UK)
 MoM – (a) Multiple of the median
 MOM – (a) Message-oriented middleware
 MOM – (a) Master's Degree in Oriental medicine
 MoMA – (a) Museum of Modern Art (NYC)
 mon – (s) Mongolian language (ISO 639-2 code)
 MOND – (p) Modified Newtonian Dynamics
 MOO – (i) Measure Of Outcome
 MOOTW – (p) Military Operations Other Than War ("moot-double-you")
 MOP – (s) Macau pataca (ISO 4217 currency code) – (i) Measure Of Performance
 MOPE – (a) Ministry of Population and Environment (Nepal) – Most Oppressed People Ever (politics)
 MOPP – (i/a) Mission-Oriented Protective Posture
 MORP – (a) Meteorite Observation and Recovery Project
 MORS – (i) Military Operations Research Society
 MOS – (i) Military Occupational Specialty – (a) Mit Out Sound / Motor Only Sync – (i) Mobile Object System – Model Output Statistics – Multiplayer Online Services - (a) Mean Opinion Score
 MOS-CQ - (a) Mean Opinion Score - Conversational Quality (ITU-T P.800.1)
 MOS-LQ - (a) Mean Opinion Score - Listening Quality (ITU-T P.800.1)
 MOSFET – (a) Metal-Oxide-Semiconductor Field-Effect Transistor
 MOSS – (p) MObile Submarine Simulator – (a) Moving Object Support System
 MOT – (i) Ministry of Transport (UK)
 MOTA – (i) Member of the Orthodontic Technicians Association
 MOTESS – (a) Moving Object and Transient Event Search System
 MOTO – (a) Mail Order / Telephone Order – Master of the obvious
 MOU – (i) Memorandum Of Understanding
 MOUT – (i) Military Operations in Urban[ized] Terrain
 MOVES – (a) Modeling, Virtual Environments, and Simulation Institute
 MOW – (i) Maintenance of way (also MW)
 MOZ – (s) Mozambique (ISO 3166 trigram)

MP
 MP – (i) Magic points – (s) Mauritius (FIPS 10-4 country code) – (i) Member of Parliament – Military Police – Missouri Pacific – (s) Northern Mariana Islands (postal symbol; ISO 3166 digram)
 mPa – (s) Millipascal
 MPa – (s) Megapascal
 MPA - Master of Public Administration
 MPA – (i) Maritime Patrol Aircraft
 MPAA – (i) Motion Picture Association of America
 MPC – (i) Minor Planet Center – Minor Planet Circular
 MPC – (i) Military Payment Certificate
 MPEC – (i) Minor Planet Electronic Circular
 MPEG – (a) Motion Pictures (Coding) Experts Group
 MPEV – (i) Multi-Purpose Engineering Vehicle
 MPF – (i) Maritime Prepositioning Force
 MPFC – (i) Medial PreFrontal Cortex
 MPG - (i) Miles Per Gallon
 MPMC – (i) Medial PreMotor Cortex
 MPSI – (i) Member of the Pharmaceutical Society of Ireland
 MPSoC – (i) MultiProcessor System-on-Chip
 MPSRON – (p) Maritime Propositioning Ship Squadron

MQ
 MQ – (s) Martinique (ISO 3166 digram) – Midway Islands (FIPS 10-4 territory code)

MR
 mr – (s) Marathi language (ISO 639-1 code)
 MR – (s) Mauritania (FIPS 10-4 country code; ISO 3166 digram)
 MR-ATGW – (i) Medium-Range Anti-Tank Guided Weapon
 MRAV – (i) Multi-Role Armoured Vehicle
 MRBM – (i) Medium Range Ballistic Missile
 MRC – (i) Maintenance Requirements Card
 MRD – (i) Motorized Rifle Division
 MRE – (i) Meal Ready to Eat (U.S. military rations)
 MRGO – (i) Mississippi River–Gulf Outlet Canal (also referred to as MR-GO or "Mr. Go")
 MRGW – (i) Medium-Range Guided Weapon
 mri – (s) Māori language (ISO 639-2 code)
 MRI – (i) Magnetic Resonance Imaging
 MRL – (i) Multiple Rocket Launcher
 MRO
 (i) Maintenance, Repair and Operating
 Mars Reconnaissance Orbiter
 (s) Mauritanian ouguiya (ISO 4217 currency code)
 MRPharmS – (i) Member of the Royal Pharmaceutical Society (Great Britain)
 MRR
 (i) Maximum Rock and Roll
 Minimum-Risk Route
 My Restaurant Rules
 MRS – (i) Magnetic Resonance Spectroscopy
 MRSA – (i/a) Methicillin-resistant Staphylococcus aureus (sometimes pronounced "MER-sa")
 MRT
 (i) Mass Rapid Transit — used as either an official or unofficial name for metro systems in Singapore, Kaohsiung, Bangkok, Taipei, Chennai, and Delhi
 (s) Mauritania (ISO 3166 trigram)
 MRTFB – (i) U.S. Major Range and Test Facility Base

MS
 ms
 (s) Malay language (ISO 639-1 code)
 Millisecond
 mS – (s) Millisiemens
 Ms – (s) Megasecond
 MS
 (i) mano sinistra (Latin, "left hand")
 (p) manuscript
 (i) Master of Science
 (s) Megasiemens
 (p) Microsoft (sometimes M$)
 (s) Mississippi (postal symbol)
 Montserrat (ISO 3166 digram)
 (i) Multiple Sclerosis
 M&S
 (i) Modelling & Simulation
 Marks & Spencer
 MSA – (s) Malay language (ISO 639-2 code)
 MSB
 (i) Main Support Battalion
 Most Significant Bit (or Byte)
 MSD – (i) Minimum Safe Distance
 MSDB – (i) Multi Source Data Base
 MSDE
 (i) Maryland State Department of Education
 (p) Microsoft Data[base] Engine
 Microsoft SQL Server 2000 Desktop Engine
 (i) Military Scenario Development Environment
 Mission Simulation Dynamic Engine
 MSDL – (i) Military Scenario Definition Language
 MSE – (i) Multiple Subscriber Element
 MSEC – (p) Message Security Encryption Code ("emm-sec")
 MSG
 (i) MonoSodium Glutamate
 Madison Square Garden (either the 1879, 1890, 1925, or current versions of the venue)
 MSH
 (i) Medium Support Helicopter
 Mount St. Helens
 MSI
 (i) Micro-Star International
 (p) Multispectral imagery
 MSIE
 (i) Microsoft Internet Explorer
 Master of Science in Industrial Engineering
 MSL
 (i) Mars Science Laboratory
 Mean Sea Level
 (p) Missile
 MSLP – (i) Mean Sea Level Pressure
 MSM
 (p) Mainstream media
 (i) Men who have sex with men
 Mount St Mary's School
 MSN
 (i) Microsoft Network
 Master of Science in Nursing
 MSNBC – (i) Microsoft National Broadcasting Company Cable news channel (see also msnbc.com)
 MSO – (i) Multiple System Operator
 MSP - Member of the Scottish Parliament
 MSPA
 (p) Migrant and Seasonal worker Protection Act
 (a) MS Paint Adventures
 MSPB – (i) Merit Systems Protection Board
 MSR
 (i) Main Supply Route
 Module Service Record
 (s) Montserrat (ISO 3166 trigram)
 (i) Motor Schlepp Regulung
 Mountain Safety Research (outdoor supplies manufacturer)
 MSSA
 Member of the Order of the Star of South Africa
 (i) Methicillin-susceptible Staphylococcus aureus
 (i) Military Selective Service Act
 (i) Military-style semi-automatic
 (i) Mind Sports South Africa
 (i) Montreal Student Space Associations
 MSSA Chemical Company, formerly known as Métaux Spéciaux.
 MST
 (i) Madison Symmetric Torus
 Mountain Standard Time (UTC−7 hours)
 MST3K or MST3k – (i) Mystery Science Theater 3000
 MSU
 (i) Michigan State University
 Montana State University
 Mountain State University
 Lomonosov Moscow State University (Russia, a.k.a. MGU)

MT
 mt – (s) Maltese language (ISO 639-1 code)
 mT – (s) Millitesla
 Mt – (s) Meitnerium
 MT
 (s) Malta (FIPS 10-4 country code; ISO 3166 digram)
 Megatesla
 Montana (postal symbol)
 (i) Motor Transport (military)
 MTA
 (i) Metropolitan Transportation Authority (Boston) (now Massachusetts Bay Transportation Authority)
 Metropolitan Transportation Authority
 MTBF – (i) Mean time between failures
 MtF – (i) Male-to-female transsexual
 MTF
 (i) Magnetized target fusion
 Medical Treatment Facility
 Message Text Format
 Modulation transfer function (optics)
 MTG – (i) Magic: The Gathering
 MTL
 (s) Maltese lira (ISO 4217 currency code)
 (i) Mean Tide Level (nautical charts)* MTM – (i) Methods-Time Measurement
 MTOE – (p) Modified Table of Organization and Equipment ("emm-toe")
 MTP
 (i) Maritime Tactical Publication
 Materiel Transfer Plan
 Mission Training Plan
 MTQ – (s) Martinique (ISO 3166 trigram)
 MTR
 (i) Main and Tail Rotor (helicopter type)
 Mass Transit Railway (Hong Kong metro system)
 Military-Technological Revolution
 MTS
 (i) Maintenance Training System
 Manitoba Telephone System and Manitoba Telecom Services, former names of Bell MTS
 Michigan Terminal/Timesharing System
 Movement Tracking System
 Multichannel television sound
 Multi-Technical Services
 MTT – (p) Methylthiazol tetrazolium (assay)
 MTU – (i) Tankovei Mostoukladchik (Russian Танковый Мостоукладчик, "Tank Bridge-Layer") †
 MTV
 (i) MainosTeleVisio (Finnish commercial TV company)
 Music TeleVision
 MTVL – (i) Mobile Tracked Vehicle, Light
 MTWS – (i) MAGTF Tactical Warfare System

MU
 MU – (s) Mauritius (ISO 3166 digram) – Oman (FIPS 10-4 country code; from Muscat)
 MUA – (i) Meritorious Unit Award – Military Utility Assessment
 MUR – (s) Mauritius rupee (ISO 4217 currency code)
 MUS – (s) Mauritius (ISO 3166 trigram)

MV
 mV – (s) Millivolt
 MV – (s) Maldives (FIPS 10-4 country code; ISO 3166 digram) – Megavolt – (i) Motor Vehicle – Motor Vessel
 MVC – (i) Missouri Valley Conference
 MVFC – (i) Missouri Valley Football Conference
 MVNO – (i) Mobile virtual network operator
 MVP – (i) Most Valuable Player
 MVR – (s) Maldivian rufiyaa (ISO 4217 currency code)

MW
 mW – (s) Milliwatt
 MW
 (i) Maintenance of way (also MOW)
 (s) Malawi (ISO 3166 digram)
 (i) Medium Wave (radio)
 (s) Megawatt
 (i) Mountain West (Conference) (formal initialism since July 2011)
 MWC
 (i) Maritime Warfare Centre (various nations)
 Mountain West Conference (still used informally, although the league has adopted "MW")
 MWESH – (p) Machismo Wizards Extended SHelter (operating system)
 MWI – (s) Malawi (ISO 3166 trigram)
 MWK – (s) Malawian kwacha (ISO 4217 currency code)
 MWOA – (i) Mount Wilson Observatory Association
 MWR – (i) Morale, Welfare, and Recreation
 MWTB - (a) Mounted Warfare Test Bed

MX
 MX – (a) Mail Exchange – (s) Mexico (FIPS 10-4 country code; ISO 3166 digram) – (p) Missile eXperimental
 MXN – (s) Mexican peso (ISO 4217 currency code)

MY
 my – (s) Burmese language (ISO 639-1 code)
 MY – (s) Malaysia (FIPS 10-4 country code; ISO 3166 digram)
 mya – (s) Burmese language (ISO 639-2 code) – (i) million years ago
 MYOB – (i) Mind Your Own Business
 MYR – (s) Malaysian ringgit (ISO 4217 currency code)
 MYS – (s) Malaysia (ISO 3166 trigram)
 MYT – (s) Mayotte (ISO 3166 trigram)

MZ
 MZ – (i) Mach-Zehnder (interferometer) – (s) Magnetic Azimuth – (i) Move, Zig (Zero Wing) – (s) Mozambique (FIPS 10-4 country code; ISO 3166 digram)
 MZN – (s) Mozambique metical (ISO 4217 currency code)

References

Acronyms M